Handball has been a Central American Games event since 2001 in Guatemala City, Guatemala. In addition to crowning the handball champions of the Central American Games, the tournament also serves as a qualifying tournament for the Central American and Caribbean Games.

Men

Summary

Medal table

Participating nations

Women

Summary

Medal table

Participating nations

References
 www.panamhandball.org

Central American Games
Central American Games
Central American Games